John Crowe is Fine Gael Councillor in Clare and was Mayor of County Clare from 2014 to 2015.

See also
Politics of Ireland

References

Fine Gael politicians
Living people
Year of birth missing (living people)
Place of birth missing (living people)